Cletocamptus is a genus of marine and brackish-water copepods, containing the following species:

Cletocamptus affinis Kiefer, 1957
Cletocamptus albuquerquensis (Herrick, 1895)
Cletocamptus assimilis Gómez & Gee, 2009
Cletocamptus axi Mielke, 2000
Cletocamptus bermudae Willey, 1930
Cletocamptus bicolor (C. B. Wilson, 1931)
Cletocamptus blanchardi (Richard, 1889)
Cletocamptus brehmi Kiefer, 1934
Cletocamptus brevicaudata (Herrick, 1895)
Cletocamptus cecsurirensis Gomez, Scheihing & Labarca, 2007
Cletocamptus confluens (Schmeil, 1894)
Cletocamptus croisicensis (Labbé, 1927)
Cletocamptus dadayi (Delachaux, 1918)
Cletocamptus deborahdexterae Gomez, Fleeger, Rocha-Olivares & Foltz, 2004
Cletocamptus deitersi (Richard, 1897)
Cletocamptus dominicanus Kiefer, 1934
Cletocamptus feei (Shen, 1956)
Cletocamptus fourchensis Gomez, Fleeger, Rocha-Olivares & Foltz, 2004
Cletocamptus gabrieli Löffler, 1961
Cletocamptus gravihiatus (Shen & Sung, 1963)
Cletocamptus helobius Fleeger, 1980
Cletocamptus kummleri (Delachaux, 1918)
Cletocamptus levis Gomez, 2005
Cletocamptus merbokensis Gee, 1999
Cletocamptus nudus Gomez, 2005
Cletocamptus pilosus Gómez & Gee, 2009
Cletocamptus racovitzae (Labbé, 1926)
Cletocamptus retrogressus Shmankevich, 1875
Cletocamptus schmidti Mielke, 2000
Cletocamptus servus (Labbé, 1926)
Cletocamptus sinaloensis Gomez, Fleeger, Rocha-Olivares & Foltz, 2004
Cletocamptus spinulosus Gómez & Gee, 2009
Cletocamptus stimpsoni Gomez, Fleeger, Rocha-Olivares & Foltz, 2004
Cletocamptus tertius Gómez & Gee, 2009
Cletocamptus trichotus Kiefer, 1929
Cletocamptus xenuus Por, 1968

References

Harpacticoida